This is a list of islands of Angola:

Bulikoko
Ilha Cacuanza
Ilha Cajú
Ilha da Cazanga
Ilha Cocavuna
Ilha Condo
Dalangombe
Ilha do Dostero
Ilha Holongo
Ilhas Jacinto
Kwanda Island
Ilha Liesse
Ilha de Luanda
Ilha Macundi
Ilhas de Monroe
Ilha Ndalangombe
Ilha Ngola
Ilha Ngunza
Ilhéu dos Pássaros
Ilha Pendi
Ilheús do Pina
Ilha da Quissanga
Ilha Quixingango
Ilha Roca
Ilha de Sacabenda
Ilha Sacra Mbaca
Ilha Sanga
Ilha Selonga
Ilha do Sumbo
Ilha Tchicuanza
Ilha dos Tigres
Ilha Zaida

Islands
Angola